Sibirganovo (Sebergän) is a rural locality (a village) in Kainlykovsky Selsoviet, Burayevsky District, Bashkortostan, Russia. The population was 34 as of 2010. There is 1 street.

Geography 
Sibirganovo is located 10 km southwest of Burayevo (the district's administrative centre) by road. Kushmanakovo is the nearest rural locality.

References 

Rural localities in Burayevsky District